Vlado Jeknić (Cyrillic: Владо Јекнић, born 14 August 1983) is a Montenegrin retired footballer who last played for Sutjeska in the Montenegrin First League.

Club career
Jeknić played for the German sides SV Wacker Burghausen and SV Wehen Wiesbaden in the 2. Bundesliga and Diósgyőri VTK in Hungary.

He transferred to the Chinese club Beijing Baxy&Shengshi in July 2010 and moved to the Chinese club Fujian Smart Hero in March 2012.

International career
Jeknić made his debut for Montenegro in his country's first ever competitive match on 24 March 2007, a friendly against Hungary in Podgorica. He has earned a total six caps, scoring no goals. His final international was another friendly against Hungary in August 2008.

References

External links

1983 births
Living people
People from Šavnik
Association football defenders
Serbia and Montenegro footballers
Serbia and Montenegro under-21 international footballers
Montenegrin footballers
Montenegro international footballers
FK Crvena Stijena players
FK Sutjeska Nikšić players
SV Wacker Burghausen players
SV Wehen Wiesbaden players
Diósgyőri VTK players
Beijing Sport University F.C. players
Cangzhou Mighty Lions F.C. players
First League of Serbia and Montenegro players
2. Bundesliga players
Nemzeti Bajnokság I players
China League One players
Montenegrin First League players
Serbia and Montenegro expatriate footballers
Expatriate footballers in Germany
Serbia and Montenegro expatriate sportspeople in Germany
Montenegrin expatriate footballers
Montenegrin expatriate sportspeople in Germany
Expatriate footballers in Hungary
Montenegrin expatriate sportspeople in Hungary
Expatriate footballers in China
Montenegrin expatriate sportspeople in China